Agneepath is the soundtrack album for 2012 film of the same name produced by Hiroo Yash Johar and Karan Johar under Dharma Productions and directed by Karan Malhotra in his directorial debut. The film stars Hrithik Roshan, Sanjay Dutt, Rishi Kapoor, Priyanka Chopra, Kanika Tiwari, Om Puri and Zarina Wahab. The music of Agneepath was composed by Ajay–Atul, with lyrics written by Amitabh Bhattacharya.

Development 
The songs were composed with the help of live instrumentation being extensively used. While explaining the process involved in composing the soundtrack, Ajay said that Malhotra narrated the story to them for over four hours, whilst humming the background score that he wanted. This was followed by innumerable discussions which made them "understand each other well". He also mentioned that the song "Chikni Chameli" was a remake of their own Marathi song "Kombdi Palali" from the film Jatra (2006).

Release 

The film's audio was digitally released on 12 December 2011, and a physical release of the album took place on 16 December at the Radio City FM station (Mumbai) with the composer duo, lyricist and the director in attendance.

Track listing

Reception 

The music of Agneepath has received positive reviews from critics. Joginder Tuteja praised the compositions and added that "Chikni Chameli" would be responsible for the rise in sales of the album. Sukanya Verma of Rediff.com gave the album 3 out of 5 stars and said that the film's soundtrack was better than that of the original, while praising the composition of the songs "Deva Shree Ganesha" and "O Saiyyan". A review carried by the BBC summed up, "Blessedly free of unnecessary remixes, Agneepath is a well-crafted, evocative collection of songs that proves the adage that, when it comes to Indian music composers, sometimes two heads can be better than one. The song "Chikni Chameli" was extremely well received and topped the music charts.

Controversy 
In January 2012, a plagiarism suit was filed against Sony Music and Dharma Productions by a Mumbai-based engineer, for lifting and featuring the song "O Saiyyan" in the album. The Nagpur High Court ordered Johar to release the film, only after truncating the use of the song in it.

Awards and nominations

References 

Hindi film soundtracks
2012 soundtrack albums